A Kangaroo was a Canadian armoured personnel carrier (APC) during the Second World War which was created by converting a tank chassis. Kangaroos were created as an expedient measure "in the field" by the Canadian Army, and were so successful that they were used by other Commonwealth forces, including the British Army.

Their ability to manoeuvre in the field with tanks was a major advantage over earlier designs, and led to the dedicated APC designs that were introduced by almost all armies immediately after the war.

History 
The earliest iterations of the Kangaroo were created from M3 and M5 Stuart light tanks to serve as artillery tractors in North Africa campaign in circumstances where Universal Carriers were unavailable. They were effective in their role, but attempts by soldiers to use them as improvised APCs proved ill-advised due to the Stuart's very light armour. 

In July 1944, Lieutenant-General Harry Crerar's First Canadian Army was concerned by manpower shortages due to combat losses. While the British and Canadian forces had received some American M3 Half-track APCs, the supply was heavily reduced by this point due to the Americans' own need for them, and Universal Carriers were individually insufficient despite the enormous numbers. However, self-propelled artillery and tanks were currently oversupplied, with a significant number sitting idle not being used. Lieutenant-General Guy Simonds, commander of II Canadian Corps, devised Kangaroos as a field-expedient alternative to purpose-built APCs.

The original Kangaroos were converted from 72 M7 Priest self-propelled guns of three field artillery regiments of the 3rd Canadian Infantry Division. The Priests were "defrocked" at the Advanced Workshop
Depot under the codename "Kangeroo", removing their 105mm guns and ammunition stowage, and separating the driver's compartment from the rest of the vehicle. Priests with machine gun turrets retained them, and some that did not already have machine gun mounts had improvised ones fitted. When the 3rd Canadian Infantry Division was re-equipped with towed Ordnance QF 25-pounder gun-howitzers in late July, the rest of their self-propelled tracked vehicles were stripped of their 105mm guns and converted to Kangaroos. Later Kangaroos were based on Sherman, Churchill, and obsolete Canadian Ram tanks. The process was broadly similar, with the entire turret removed, ammunition storage removed, bench seats fitted in the turret ring area, and the driver's compartment separated. Hull machine guns were retained, and new machine guns were sometimes fitted to the turret ring. Kangaroos in general were supposed to carry 8 to 12 soldiers, though similar to the practice of troops riding on tanks, it was more common to simply cram as many as could fit without being at risk of falling off.

The Priest Kangaroos were first used on 8 August 1944 south of Caen during Operation Totalize to supplement the half-tracks already available. When re-converted Kangaroos were returned to U.S. custody, other vehicles were pressed into service, the vast majority (some 500) being Rams, which were standing idle after being used as training vehicles when Canadian armoured formations re-equipped with Shermans. The Ram gun tanks were shipped to France and duly converted, deploying piecemeal as they arrived.

While 'debussing' - climbing out of the hull and jumping down, potentially under fire - was challenging, the obvious difficulty of getting into a vehicle that was designed to prevent enemy soldiers climbing onto it was quickly appreciated. Accordingly, climbing rungs were soon added as a field modification that also simplified loading the carrying compartment with ammunition, food and other supplies to troops under fire.

The Ram Kangaroo entered service piecemeal with the Canadians in September 1944, but in December these minor units were combined to form the 1st Canadian Armoured Carrier Regiment (initially the 1st Canadian Armoured Personnel Carrier Regiment), joining the British 49th Armoured Carrier Regiment under the British 79th Armoured Division which was the administrative division for the deployment of the specialized combat support vehicles known as "Hobart's Funnies".

The first operation for the Ram Kangaroo was Operation Astonia, the assault on Le Havre 10-12 September 1944, the last the British 7th Armoured Division's march into Hamburg on 3 May 1945 in the Capture of Hamburg.

In Italy, Sherman III tanks and some Priests were converted for use by the British Eighth Army. Removing the turret of the Sherman and some internal fittings gave room for carrying up to ten troops.

From 1943, Stuart tanks (both M3 and M5) had their turrets removed and seating fitted to carry infantry troops attached to British armoured brigades.

Gallery

See also
 Lorraine 37L
 Churchill tank
 Sherman tank
 Operation Totalize
 BTR-T and IDF Achzarit, less haphazard conversions of T-55s into APCs.
 Namer
 Nagmachon

References

 The Battle for the Rhine 1944, 2005, Robin Neillands (chapter 7, "The Battle for the Scheldt")

External links

Priest Kangaroo at web.inter.nl.net
Ram Kangaroo at militaryfactory.com
Canadian Kangaroos.CA, dedicated to 1CACR
RAM Kangaroo vehicle datasheet
Kangaroo Development and description

Armoured personnel carriers of the United Kingdom
World War II armoured fighting vehicles of the United Kingdom
World War II armoured fighting vehicles of Canada
Tracked armoured personnel carriers
Military vehicles introduced from 1940 to 1944
Armoured personnel carriers of WWII